Rod Hardy (born in Melbourne, Australia) is an Australian television and film director.

Career 
His interest in film began before the age of 12, when he shot several short films on his brother's 8 mm film camera. Rod has over 350 hours of credits directing television drama in his native Australia.

His first feature film, Thirst, won Best Picture in its category at the 1980 Asia Pacific Film Festival.

Having honed his directing and producing skills in Australia, primarily on the TV series, E Street from 1989 to 1991 of which he was the co-executive producer, Hardy moved to Los Angeles in 1992 to launch his American career.
His first assignment was to direct Lies and Lullabies the traumatic life story of pregnant cocaine addicts, starring Susan Dey and Piper Laurie. The movie was awarded the Scott Newman Award (founded by Paul Newman and Joanne Woodward in memory of their son) that is presented annually to the production that best illustrates the degradation of and triumph over drug addiction.

Since his award-winning U.S. directorial debut, he has garnered both Golden Globe and Emmy nominations for movies of the week and mini-series.

Hardy is well known in U.S. television circles for shows such as The X-Files, Battlestar Galactica and Leverage.

Filmography (as director)

Films and miniseries
Thirst (1979)
Sara Dane (1982)
Under Capricorn (1983)
Eureka Stockade (1984)
Shadows of the Heart (1990)
Rio Diablo (1993)
Between Love and Hate (1993)
Lies and Lullabies (1993)
The Only Way Out (1993)
My Name Is Kate (1994)
The Yearling (1994)
Buffalo Girls (1995)
An Unfinished Affair (1996)
20,000 Leagues Under the Sea (1997)
Robinson Crusoe (1997)
Two For Texas (1998)
Nick Fury: Agent of S.H.I.E.L.D. (1998)
High Noon (2000)
Route 52 (2002)
December Boys (2007)
Silent Night (2014)
Lucky Valentine (2014)

TV series
E Street (co-executive producer)
The Mentalist
Leverage (TV series)
Mental (TV series)
Saving Grace (TV series)
Dollhouse (TV series)
Burn Notice
Battlestar Galactica (TV series)
JAG
The X-Files
Powers (TV series)
The Librarians (TV series)
Prisoner (TV series)
Neighbours, including iconic episode The Wedding - Episode 523

See also
Not Quite Hollywood

References

External links 
 

Living people
Film directors from Melbourne
Year of birth missing (living people)